The 2023 Port Adelaide Football Club season is the club's 27th season in the Australian Football League (AFL) and the 153rd year since its inception in 1870. The club will also field its reserves men's team in the South Australian National Football League (SANFL) and its women's team in the AFL Women's (AFLW).

Squads

AFL

SANFL

AFLW
 To be announced in mid-2023

AFL season

Pre-season

Regular season

 Rounds 12-22 under construction

Ladder

SANFL season

Pre-season

Source:

Regular season

 Rounds 6-18 under construction

Ladder

AFLW season

Pre-season
 Fixtures to be announced in ~ August 2023

Regular season
 Fixtures to be announced in mid-2023

Ladder
 To appear at a later date.

References

External links
 Official website of the Port Adelaide Football Club
 Official website of the Australian Football League

2023
Port Adelaide Football Club